Ángel Luis Fernández Serrano (born 26 February 1970 in Puertollano, Castile-La Mancha), known as Ángel Luis, is a Spanish retired footballer who played as a midfielder.

External links

1970 births
Living people
People from Puertollano
Sportspeople from the Province of Ciudad Real
Spanish footballers
Footballers from Castilla–La Mancha
Association football midfielders
La Liga players
Segunda División players
Segunda División B players
Tercera División players
CE L'Hospitalet players
RCD Espanyol footballers
RCD Mallorca players
CP Mérida footballers
UE Lleida players
Villarreal CF players
CD Logroñés footballers
Mérida UD footballers
UE Sant Andreu footballers
Spain under-23 international footballers
Spanish football managers